Henry Tan Chi Sieng Sy Sr. (October 15, 1924 – January 19, 2019) was a Filipino businessman and investor.

Born in Fujian, he moved with his family to the Philippines at age 12. His family would later return to China, with Henry staying behind to establish ShoeMart, a small Manila shoe store, in 1958. Over the decades he developed ShoeMart into SM Investments, one of the largest conglomerates in the Philippines, including 49 SM malls in the Philippines and China, 62 department stores, 56 supermarkets and over 200 grocery stores. SM also owns Banco de Oro, the second-largest bank in the Philippines, as well as real estate holdings.

For eleven straight years until his death, Sy was named by Forbes as the richest person in the Philippines. When he died, his net worth was estimated at US$19 billion.

Early life and education
Henry Sy, also known as Sy Chi Sieng in Philippine Hokkien (Shī Zhìchéng in Mandarin), was born in Jinjiang in Fujian, then still under the Republic of China (ROC), on October 15, 1924. At age 12, he and his family moved to the Philippines during the Commonwealth Era under American colonial period, where his father set up a shop that sold various household items. At his father's store, Sy helped his father sell rice, sardines and other items. Following World War II, the store was obliterated along with the rest of Manila. His family decided to return to China, but Sy stayed in the Philippines where he completed his secondary education at an institution now known as the Chiang Kai Shek College in Tondo, Manila and earned his Associate of Arts degree in commercial studies at Far Eastern University in 1950. At school, he learned English and Filipino (Tagalog).

Career
In his twenties, Sy became a store manager working for an American business involved in the local shoe industry in the Philippines; he opened his first sole-proprietorship store in Quiapo, Manila in 1948. He opened at least three shoe stores in the Carriedo area which was then known for its heavy pedestrian traffic. His decision to sell shoes was due to the losses his family experienced in World War II thinking that everyone would need shoes following the aftermath of the war.

He sold surplus G.I. boots and saved finances before he established ShoeMart in 1958, his own small shoe store in Quiapo, that marked the beginning of SM Prime. He later encountered difficulties in sourcing shoes locally and decided to import shoes from outside the country.

Sy became involved in the banking industry when he acquired Acme Savings Bank (later renamed Banco de Oro or BDO) in 1967.

In November 1972, he opened SM Quiapo, SM's first stand alone department store, and entrusted his 22-year-old daughter Teresita to run the store. On November 8, 1985, he established his first SM Supermall, SM City North EDSA. In the early 1990s, SM started opening more shopping malls with the setting up of two malls in Metro Manila and a solitary mall in Cebu City. SM Prime Holdings was incorporated in 1994 and went public.

Sy was named "Richest Man of the Year" by the Makati Business Club in 1999 and was conferred an Honorary Doctorate in Business Management by De La Salle University in January of that year. He and his wife established the SM Foundation Inc., which helps underprivileged youths, the disabled and the elderly. He established business presence in Mainland China when the SM Group opened its first shopping mall in his native Xiamen. Other malls were later set up in other parts of Southern China.

In August 2005, Sy's stake in the San Miguel Corporation, Southeast Asia's largest food and beverage conglomerate, reached 11%. He sold that stake in October 2007 for $680 million.

Sy's holding company, SM Investments (also known as SM Group), has been frequently named as one of the best managed companies in the Philippines. SM Investments is the operator of Banco de Oro (BDO) and owner of Chinabank. In 2006, Sy bought the remaining 66% of Equitable PCI Bank, the Philippines' third largest lender, and merged it into BDO the following year. The transaction turned BDO into the second largest financial company in the country.

He was the Philippines' richest man, gaining $5 billion in 2010, amid the global financial crisis. The huge gain was due to his holding company, SM Investments, which has interests in BDO, inter alia. For 11 straight years until his death in 2019, Forbes ranked him as the richest person in the Philippines, with an estimated net worth of US$19 billion in 2019.

In 2017, Sy stepped down as chairman of SM Investments Corporation and was given the honorary title of Chairman Emeritus as recognition for being the founder of the SM Group. Jose Sio succeeded Sy as chairman.

Personal life
Sy was married to Felicidad Tan, who was a shoelace vendor. The couple had six children: Teresita, Elizabeth, Henry Jr., Hans, Herbert, and Harley. Teresita and Henry Jr. are vice chairpersons of SM Investments, serving under chairman Jose Sio, a longtime lieutenant of Henry Sr. Harley serves as executive director of SM.

Sy had several grandchildren, including the deceased Jan Catherine Sy, from his son Henry Jr. and Marc Sy, from his daughter Elizabeth Sy

Death
Sy died in his sleep on January 19, 2019, aged 94. He was discovered on the morning of that day, in his home in Forbes Park, Makati. The interment took place at the Heritage Memorial Park in Taguig, on January 24.

References

1924 births
2019 deaths
Billionaires from Fujian
Burials at The Heritage Park
Businesspeople from Fujian
Businesspeople in real estate
Chinese emigrants to the Philippines
Far Eastern University alumni
Filipino bankers
Filipino billionaires
Filipino company founders
Filipino people of Chinese descent
Naturalized citizens of the Philippines
People from Jinjiang, Fujian
People from Makati
People named in the Pandora Papers
Retail company founders
Real estate and property developers
Filipino chairpersons of corporations